Quobba Station, most commonly referred to as Quobba, is a pastoral lease that operates as a sheep station in Western Australia. It was originally owned by Charles Augustus Fane and Charles Eugene Fane, who named it Point Charles.

Description
It is bounded by Boolathana Station and Lake Macleod to the east and the south, Gnaraloo to the north, and the Indian Ocean to the west. The property is the most westerly station in Australia.

The area is composed of coastal rangeland vegetated in saltbush, karara and buffalo grass.

History
The station was previously known as Point Charles Station after Charles Augustus Fane, who transferred the ownership to Charles Eugene Fane and Dan Powell in 1909. French and Baston acquired the station and the sheep from Charles Eugene Fane in 1923.

The property was owned by George Baston and Leonard French in 1923. In 1925, over 8,000 sheep were shorn at Quobba. In 1929 French died following a long illness. Baston died in 1940 and left the property to his son Keith.

In 1941 following the battle between the German auxiliary cruise Kormoran and the Australian cruiser , survivors from Kormoran came ashore in a 46-man cutter near 17-Mile Well and a 57-man lifeboat near Red Bluff. Staff at Quobba rounded up both groups that had made landfall, who did not resist capture.

The Meecham family acquired the property in 1977 and switched from rearing merino sheep for wool to damara sheep for meat.  the property has a flock of approximately 10,000 damaras.

In 2015 the station owners had to renegotiate the lease agreement with the state government, including having the government excise sections of pastoral land along the world-heritage-listed Ningaloo Coast from the property, for conservation and tourism ventures.

Tourism

Tourism and recreational activities, particularly fishing and surfing, have progressively increased since the 1970s. , tourism accounted for 20% of the station's income. Attractions around the property include Ningaloo Reef, blowholes, the wreck of the bulk carrier Korean Star and a memorial cairn to HMAS Sydney. The station provides a variety of accommodation and a shop at Red Bluff.

Surfing
In 2012, a surfer survived a shark attack there, and was rescued by other surfers.

See also
 List of pastoral leases in Western Australia

References

Pastoral leases in Western Australia
Stations (Australian agriculture)
Shire of Carnarvon
1898 establishments in Australia
Surfing locations in Western Australia